Ira Lewis Metsky  (27 August 1932 – 4 April 2015) was an American actor, writer, and playwright. Lewis was best known for his one-act play, Chinese Coffee, which opened at the Circle in the Square Theatre in 1992, starring Al Pacino. A film adaptation of Chinese Coffee, also starring Pacino, as well as Jerry Orbach, was released in 2000. Ira Lewis wrote the film's screenplay, while Pacino directed the adaptation.

Biography
Lewis was born on August 27, 1932 in Newark, New Jersey. He studied acting and made his Broadway debut in Arthur Miller’s Incident at Vichy. In 1965, Lewis toured with a production of Long Day’s Journey Into Night.

Lewis died in Edison, New Jersey, of complications following heart surgery on 4 April 2015. He was a resident of Westfield, New Jersey.

Filmography
 Personal Sergeant (2004)
 Loose Cannons (1990)
 Tough Guys Don't Dance (1987)
 The Equalizer (1987)
 Rollover (1981)
 Woman of Valor (1977)
 What's So Bad About Feeling Good? (1968)
 The Flesh Eaters (1964)
 Soft Skin on Black Silk (1959)
 The Phil Silvers Show (1957)
 I Spy (1955)

References

External links

1932 births
2015 deaths
Screenwriters from New Jersey
People from Westfield, New Jersey
Male actors from Newark, New Jersey
20th-century American dramatists and playwrights
Writers from Newark, New Jersey